Sticky Fingers is an Australian Indie rock band formed in 2008 in Sydney. The band consists of Dylan Frost (lead vocals/guitar), Paddy Cornwall (bass/vocals), Seamus Coyle (lead guitar), Beaker Best (drums/percussion) and Freddy Crabs (keys/synth). Former band member Taras Hrubyj-Piper (guitar/keyboards) left the band in 2009, shortly after their debut EP Helping Hand was released.

They have released five studio albums: Caress Your Soul (2013), Land of Pleasure (2014), Westway (The Glitter & The Slums) (2016), Yours to Keep (2019) and Lekkerboy (2022), as well as three EPs: Helping Hand (2009), Extended Play (2010), and Happy Endings (2011). Their third album was the first album to debut and appear at number 1 on the Australian Albums Chart.

On 5 December 2016 the band announced they would be going on an indefinite hiatus in February, due to several internal issues, including multiple accounts of lead singer Dylan Frost threatening and verbally abusing other musicians. On 26 March 2018, the band announced their return via their instagram account.

History

2008–2012: Helping Hand, Extended Play and Happy Endings 
The band was formed after Cornwall and Best met Frost busking outside of the Coopers Hotel in Newtown.

In 2008, Sticky Fingers played their first live show and in October 2009, released their debut EP titled Helping Hand. The EP showcases the early sound of Sticky Fingers which is mainly reggae driven, and includes the songs "Inspirational" and "Juicy Ones" which were later re-recorded for their Extended Play EP. The EP credits Taras Hrubyj-Piper for guitar and keyboard work, as well as Caroline De Dear and rapper Mute Mc for vocal work on the song "Lyrical Stoka".

Sticky Fingers released the Extended Play EP in October 2010 (through sureshaker), and the acoustic EP Happy Endings in October 2011.

After having their applications to play the Newtown Festival rejected on two consecutive occasions, in 2010, Sticky Fingers set up their own DIY stage in a friend's backyard nearby on the day of the festival. The renegade performance caught the attention of promoters, and notably, producer Dan Hume, who would go on to produce their next 3 records. Sticky Fingers also went on to headline Newtown Festival the next year.

2012–2015: Caress Your Soul and Land of Pleasure 
Caress Your Soul, the band's debut album, was released in March 2013 and reached number 39 in the Australian Albums Chart. The band's second album Land of Pleasure reached number 3 on the Australian Albums Chart when it released in August 2014.

The band not only gained popularity in Australia, but became popular in countries such as France, Germany, New Zealand, the Netherlands and the UK. The band postponed their 2015 European tour due to personal reasons.

2015–2018: Westway (The Glitter & the Slums) and allegations of racial abuse 
Their third album Westway (The Glitter & the Slums) was mostly recorded over the course of a month in Karma Sound Studios, Bang Saray, Thailand in early 2016 and was released on 30 September 2016. Frost and Cornwall wrote the lyrics of the album and two songs, "Something Strange" featuring Australian rapper Remi and "Amillionite", were recorded in Sydney. The album debuted at number one on the Australian Albums Chart, making it the band's first number-one Australian album.

On 5 December 2016, the band announced through a Facebook post that they were going on an indefinite hiatus. Later that day, Dylan Frost posted a Facebook status on the band's page apologising for his behaviour and announcing he struggles with alcohol addiction and mental health issues. On 6 December 2016, an article published by The Sydney Morning Herald detailed further events leading to the hiatus. Frost was accused of physically threatening Aboriginal Australian singer Thelma Plum after an incident at a Sydney pub where he reportedly spat on her.

2018–19: Return from hiatus, world tour and Yours to Keep 
On 26 March 2018, the band used their Instagram account to post an image of the five members together, with the caption "Look who's back", signalling a return from their hiatus. On 30 March, they played at Bad Friday, a neighborhood music festival held in Sydney's Inner West.

On 13 April 2018, they released a comeback single, "Kick On", and announced a June 2018 world tour with shows in Australia, Mexico, the United States, the United Kingdom, Germany, the Netherlands, New Zealand and Indonesia. This tour includes a performance at Luna Park's Big Top, Sydney.

2020–present: Lekkerboy 
Sticky Fingers released "We Can Make the World Glow", the lead single from their fifth studio album, Lekkerboy, on 24 September 2021. They followed this on 29 October with two more singles from the album, which were joined together as one release titled "Saves the Day" and "My Rush". The fourth single from Lekkerboy, "Crooked Eyes", was released on 15 December 2021. On 20 April 2022, the band released Lekkerboy.

Influences
When asked where the band got their reggae vibe from, bassist Paddy Cornwall stated, Sydney 'Rock Steady Reggae got soul band 'King Tide' were [are] a huge influence on 'Sticky Fingers' opening for King Tide many times. Later on the band let King Tide open for them on their sold out run of Enmore Theatre gigs. That said, You know Dizza (Dylan) is rocking his Kiwi roots from Auckland, you know Seamus loves his rock 'n' roll, and me and Beaks just do our thing on the rhythm section." The band has stated their psychedelic reggae music has also been influenced by bands such as The Clash, Pink Floyd and the Arctic Monkeys.

"A melting pot of reggae, psych and bourbon. Hypnotising you into a swaying trance, then punching you in the face for dancing like a hippy. Their borderline contradictory fusion of flavours speaks to every walk of life, and it's this multiplicity which makes the world their oyster."

Members

Current
Dylan Frost – lead vocals, rhythm guitar (2008–present)
Paddy Cornwall – bass, backing vocals (2008–present)
Seamus Coyle – lead guitar (2008–present)
Eric "Beaker Best" da Silva Gruener – drums, percussion (2008–present)
Daniel "Freddy Crabs" Neurath – keyboard, synthesisers (2009–present)

Former
Taras Hrubyj-Piper – guitar, keyboards (2008–2009)

Discography

Studio albums

Compilation albums

Extended plays

Singles

Other charted songs

Concert tours

Caress Your Soul tours
Caress Your Soul – European Tour (June/July 2013)
Sun Shine Down on Us All Tour – Australia (September/October 2013)
Gold Snafu – Australian Tour (February/March 2014)
Gold Snafu – European Tour (April/May 2014)
Splendour in the Grass (July 2014)

Land of Pleasure tours
Land of Pleasure – Australian Tour (September/October 2014)
Land of Pleasure – European Tour (October/November 2014)
Falls Festival Tour (December 2014)
Byron Bay Bluesfest (April 2015)
Groovin' the Moo (April/May 2015)
North American Tour (July/August 2015)
Canadian Tour (September 2015)
This That (October 2015)
Originals Music Festival (November 2015)
Vanfest (December 2015)

Westway (The Glitter & the Slums) tours
"Outcast at Last" Australian Tour (April 2016; included three unannounced sold out shows at the Enmore Theatre)
"Outcast at Last" North American Tour (April/May 2016)
Splendour in the Grass (July 2016)
2016 European/UK Tour (August/September 2016)
2016 Split Milk (December 2016)
Westway (The Glitter & the Slums) – North American Tour (September/October 2016)
Westway (The Glitter & the Slums) – Australian Tour (October/November 2016)

Post-hiatus tours
Sticky Fingers World Tour (June 2018)
Australian Tour (October/November 2018)
Yours To Keep Tour (May 2019)

Sticky Fingers Australian Tour (July 2022)

References

Australian indie rock groups
Australian psychedelic rock music groups
Australian reggae musical groups
Australian soul musical groups
Reggae fusion groups
Reggae rock groups